Empress Taimu (太穆皇后; 569?–613?) was posthumously honored the first Empress of the Tang Dynasty. She was known as Duchess Dou or Lady Dou throughout her lifetime, and was the wife of Emperor Gaozu and mother of Emperor Taizong.

Background
Lady Dou was the daughter of Dou Yi and Princess Xiangyang. Dou Yi was the son of Dou Chi (竇熾), a high-level official for both Northern Zhou and later Sui. Dou Yi also had a brother named Dou Wei, a scribe for Yang Xiu, the Prince of Shu, who later served as chancellor during the early years of the Tang dynasty. Her mother Princess Xiangyang was the fifth daughter of Yuwen Tai, Emperor Wen of Northern Zhou, and the sister of Empress Yuwen.

As a young child, Lady Dou was raised in the palace and particularly favored by her uncle Yuwen Yong, Emperor Wu. She once recommended Yuwen Yong to establish a relationship between Northern Zhou and Tujue through the Heqin system. As a result, Yuwen Yong married Empress Ashina, the daughter of Muqan Qaghan. Yuwen Yong didn't favor Empress Ashina at first, but agreed after Lady Dou and her father reminded him of Tujue's power and that he still had to face the rivaling neighbor kingdoms Northern Qi and Chen Dynasty.

Lady Dou persuaded the general Zhangsun Sheng (長孫晟) to form a marriage alliance with the Tang household. Zhangsun Sheng's son Zhangsun Wuji would later become a prominent official and daughter Lady Zhangsun would become Lady Dou's daughter-in-law. After Yang Jian overthrew the Yuwen family and established the Sui Dynasty, Lady Dou lamented that she wasn't able to help her uncle and cousins. Her parents Dou Yi and Princess Xiangyang cautioned her to keep her mouth shut to live.

Duchess
As Lady Dou grew older, Dou Yi told Princess Xiangyang to marry their daughter to a wise and intelligent gentleman. Dou Yi placed two peacocks between an armorial screen and let the proposers shoot two arrows. The proposer who could shoot two arrows on the peacock's eye would be married to Lady Dou. Several proposers failed, except for a man named Li Yuan. Lady Dou and Li Yuan were married, and Li Yuan would later become the founding Emperor of the Tang Dynasty.

Lady Dou and Li Yuan were deeply in love and accompanied each other everywhere. Since Lady Dou grew up in the palace, she was familiar with politics and history books. She assisted her husband in his studies and raised their children. They had four sons, Li Jiancheng, Li Shimin, Li Xuanba, and Li Yuanji, and one daughter who would become Princess Pingyang.

Lady Dou established a close bond with her mother-in-law, Lady Dugu. Lady Dugu was the daughter of the prominent general Dugu Xin, and the sister of two Empresses from different dynasties, Empress Dugu and Dugu Qieluo. Li Yuan's father Li Bing had died early, leaving Lady Dugu in charge of the Li household. Lady Dugu suffered from poor health, and Lady Dou assisted her mother-in-law in managing household affairs. Once, Lady Dugu was extremely sick and due to her reckless personality, several of her daughter-in-laws refused to assist her. Only Lady Dou cared for Lady Dugu, and Lady Dugu recovered after a month. Lady Dugu was grateful and favored Lady Dou.

Lady Dou died at the age of 45 (by East Asian reckoning). After Li Yuan overthrew the Sui Dynasty and established the Tang Dynasty, he honored Lady Dou as Empress Mu (穆皇后). When her son Li Shimin succeeded to the throne as Emperor Taizong, he honored Lady Dou as Empress Taimu (太穆皇后). She was further honored as Empress Taimu Shunsheng (太穆顺圣皇后).

Family
Parents
Father: Dou Yi, Duke Shenwu (河南 竇毅; 519 – 3 January 583)
Mother: Princess Xiangyang (襄陽公主),
Maternal Grandfather: Yuwen Tai (宇文泰, 507 – 556)
Spouse and issue(s):
Li Yuan (李淵, 7 April 566 – 25 June 635), Emperor Gaozu of Tang
Li Jiancheng, Crown Prince Yin (隱皇太子 李建成; 589–626)
Princess Pingyangzhao (平陽昭公主; d. 623),
Married Chai Shao, Duke Huo (d. 638), and had issue (two sons)
Li Shimin, Emperor Taizong (太宗 李世民; 598–649)
Li Xuanba, Prince Weihuai (衛懷王 李玄霸; 599–614)
Li Yuanji, Prince Chaola (巢剌王 李元吉; 603–626)

References

7th-century Chinese women
7th-century Chinese people
Emperor Taizong of Tang
Tang dynasty posthumous empresses
569 births
613 deaths